The Ganges-class ships of the line were a class of six 74-gun third rates, designed for the Royal Navy by Sir Edward Hunt in 1779.

Ships

Builder: Randall, Rotherhithe
Ordered: 14 July 1779
Launched: 30 March 1782
Fate: Broken up, 1816

Builder: Randall, Rotherhithe
Ordered: 12 July 1779
Launched: 16 June 1783
Fate: Broken up, 1813

Builder: Barnard, Deptford
Ordered: 1 January 1782
Launched: 30 October 1784
Fate: Sold out of the service, 1897

Builder: Woolwich Dockyard
Ordered: 25 June 1801
Launched: 15 March 1808
Fate: Broken up, 1861

Builder: Lovji Nusserwanjee Wadia, Duncan Docks, Bombay 
Ordered: 9 July 1801
Launched: 19 June 1810
Fate: Sold out of the service, 1861

Builder: Chatham Dockyard
Ordered: 3 December 1811
Laid Down: December 1812
Launched: 15 April 1816
Fate: Hulked, 1842, Broken up 1869

References

Lavery, Brian (2003) The Ship of the Line - Volume 1: The development of the battlefleet 1650-1850. Conway Maritime Press. .
 Lyon, David, The Sailing Navy List, All the Ships of the Royal Navy - Built, Purchased and Captured 1688-1860, pub Conway Maritime Press, 1993, 

 
Ship of the line classes